Matanao, officially the Municipality of Matanao, is a 2nd class municipality in the province of Davao del Sur, Philippines. According to the 2020 census, it has a population of 60,493 people.

Matanao is bordered in the west by the town of Columbio, in the province of Sultan Kudarat, in the north by the towns of Magsaysay and Bansalan, in the east by Hagonoy and the city of Digos, and in the south by Kiblawan and Padada.

History
In June 17, 1957, some of the barrios of the municipality of Bansalan namely Kibao, San Vicente, Kibuaya, Managa Km. 67, Sinawilan, New Visayas, Sacub, Upper Malabang, Tibongbong, Sinaragan, Maliit Digos, Kapok, Tamlangon, Manga, Buas, New Katipunan, Da-Anama, Upper Kauswagan, Kagaulas, Kabasagan, Tuwak, Mal, Latian, Lanturi, Dongan-Pekong, La Union, Kauswagan, and Paitan were grouped and constituted into a new and independent municipality known as Matanao.

Matanao means a place or something to see or witness at a vantage point. In the earlier days, the place was known as “Matin-aw”, a term used to mean clear. The name is derived from the crystal clear brooks and rivers that abound in the area. No one could exactly tell how, when and why “Matin-aw” became Matanao.

In 1920, long before Matanao was formally created into a municipality, Buas had already existed (representing Matanao) as a barangay of Santa Cruz inhabited by tribal minorities, the Blaans (Bilaan) with Datu Edu Gamban as their recognized leader. In 1927, migrants from the Visayas led by the late Rosendo Javelona and his family came to the place. Protestantism was spread by one Pastor Diamonon through the Javelonas. Ranchers also invaded the place and have for themselves large homesteads. Ten years later, sometime in 1937, scores of Cebuanos came. Among them were Ildefonso Chavez, Roman Albarracin and Crispin Puerto and their kins. The next batch of Cebuanos came in the 1940s including the Famor and Relatado Clan.

Countless batches of migrants flocked to the place and various cultural influences account for what Matanao is today. The people of the municipality is a blend of Cebuanos, Ilongos, Bicolanos, Boholanos, Ilocanos, Zamboanguenos, Tagalogs, Blaans, Calagans and Bagobos, Babel of dialects was experienced by the people in the place, but Cebuano came out to be the dominating dialect, thus, becoming the mother tongue of the municipality until the present time.

Geography

Matanao is located in the province of Davao del Sur in Region XI Davao Region on Mindanao Island.

Climate

Hot and humid most of the year. May to November is typhoon season. The coldest part of the year is usually during the month of December to February and the hottest month are April and May. Rainfall distribution is more or less even during the year.

Barangays

Matanao is politically subdivided into 33 barangays. The poblacion forms the center of the municipality whereas the other 32 are in the outlying areas which several kilometers away from the town.

Demographics

Economy

Although predominantly a rice farming municipality, Matanao is a growing area for banana cultivation. Cavendish and Lakatan banana plantations are now being established in barangays Manga, Dongan-Pekong and Saboy.

References

External links
 Matanao Profile at the DTI Cities and Municipalities Competitive Index
 [ Philippine Standard Geographic Code]
Philippine Census Information
Local Governance Performance Management System

Municipalities of Davao del Sur